John Mackintosh (1833–1907) was a Scottish historian.

Life
The son of William Mackintosh, a soldier, he was born at Aberdeen on 9 November 1833, and was educated at Botriphinie parish school in Banffshire. At an early period he set up in Aberdeen as stationer and newsagent.

In 1880 Mackintosh received the degree of LL.D. from the University of Aberdeen, and in 1900 a civil list pension. He died at Aberdeen on 4 May 1907.

Works
Self-taught in Scottish history, Mackintosh published:

History of Civilisation in Scotland, four volumes 1878 to 1888, with a new edition appearing 1892–6. 
 The Story of Scotland (1890), 
 History of the Valley of the Dee (1895)
 Historical Earls and Earldoms (1898).

Notes

Citations

Sources

Attribution
 

1833 births
1907 deaths
19th-century Scottish historians
Writers from Aberdeen
Historians of Scotland
Alumni of the University of Aberdeen
19th-century Scottish businesspeople